Bahia Honda (meaning deep bay, in Spanish, locally pronounced: BAY-ah HON-da , also pronounced : Bah-EE-ah OWN-dah ) is an island in the lower Florida Keys.

The island is virtually uninhabited, being home to the  Bahia Honda State Park. Founded in 1961, the park occupies most of the island. The channel at the island's west end is one of the deepest natural channels in the Florida Keys.

Fauna
Marine life is quite plentiful in the waters surrounding the island. Just off the beach snorkelers can spot many species of small reef fish, as well as rays, barracuda, and even the occasional small nurse shark.

The only known natural colony of the now rare Miami blue butterfly was discovered in the park in 1999. The butterfly had been thought to have become extinct as a result of Hurricane Andrew in 1992.

Flora
Several rare plants, including yellow satinwood (Zanthoxylum flavum), Florida silver palm (Coccothrinax argentata), Coconut palm (Cocos nucifera), Key thatch palm (Leucothrinax morrisii), and the endangered small-flowered lily-thorn (Catesbaea parviflora) are found in the park

History
Henry Flagler's Florida East Coast Railway once ran through the present parkland to Key West. Built between 1905 and 1912, it was destroyed by the severe Labor Day Hurricane of 1935. Later, the railroad bridge foundations were used to build the Overseas Highway, which became U.S. 1. Part of the old Bahia Honda Bridge is accessible from the park, and offers a panoramic view of the islands. In 1908, the Florida East Coast Railway Company built two large two-story dormitories there to house workers building the Bahia Honda Bridge.

In 1890 Bahia Honda Key was the southern terminus for Miami-Dade county which stretched as far north as present day St. Lucie River.

Recreational activities
The  natural, white sand beach was rated the #1 beach in 1992 in the United States by "Dr. Beach" Stephen Leatherman (the first Florida beach to be so honored), making it popular for swimming. A nature trail near the park's oceanside beach skirts a tidal lagoon before passing through a coastal hardwood hammock. Bicycling and inline skating can be done on the park's  paved road, and there are several fishing and picnicking spots in the area. The Sand and Sea Nature Center features displays about local sea and shore life, including corals, shells, crabs, sea urchins, drift seeds, sea sponges and sea turtles.

Kayaks and snorkeling gear can be rented at the park, and boat trips for snorkeling on the reef are available. The park has a marina with boat slips available for overnight rental. Campsites (primitive and full hook-up) and vacation cabins are available, although reservations for the winter months can be very difficult to get.

The park is also a part of the Great Florida Birding Trail.

Hours
Florida state parks are open between 8 a.m. and sundown every day of the year (including holidays).

Climate

Bahia Honda Key has a tropical savanna climate (Aw), similar to the rest of the Florida Keys.

Gallery

References

External links

Bahia Honda State Park at Florida State Parks
Park concessionare website

Beaches of Monroe County, Florida
State parks of Florida
Parks in the Florida Keys
Uninhabited islands of Monroe County, Florida
Tourist attractions in the Florida Keys
Protected areas established in 1961
Parks in Monroe County, Florida
Nature centers in Florida
Beaches of Florida
Islands of Florida
Islands of the Florida Keys